Nanqu Subdistrict, also known as South Subdistrict or Southern Subdistrict, is a subdistrict of the city of Zhongshan, Guangdong province, China, covering  with a registered population of 21,500 and migrant population of 37,900.  Many real estate companies and hotels have set up their businesses here, such as Vanke, Wing On and Agile Property.

References

External links
Official website of South District, Zhongshan 

Zhongshan
Township-level divisions of Guangdong